Broccoli (Brassica oleracea var. italica) is an edible green plant in the cabbage family (family Brassicaceae, genus Brassica) whose large flowering head, stalk and small associated leaves are eaten as a vegetable. Broccoli is classified in the Italica cultivar group of the species Brassica oleracea. Broccoli has large flower heads, usually dark green, arranged in a tree-like structure branching out from a thick stalk which is usually light green. The mass of flower heads is surrounded by leaves. Broccoli resembles cauliflower, which is a different but closely related cultivar group of the same Brassica species.

It is eaten either raw or cooked. Broccoli is a particularly rich source of vitamin C and vitamin K. Contents of its characteristic sulfur-containing glucosinolate compounds, isothiocyanates and sulforaphane, are diminished by boiling but are better preserved by steaming, microwaving or stir-frying.

Rapini, sometimes called "broccoli rabe," is a distinct species from broccoli, forming similar but smaller heads, and is actually a type of turnip (Brassica rapa).

Etymology

History
Broccoli resulted from breeding of landrace Brassica crops in the northern Mediterranean starting in about the sixth century BC. Broccoli has its origins in primitive cultivars grown in the Roman Empire and was most likely improved via artificial selection in the southern Italian Peninsula or in Sicily. Broccoli was spread to northern Europe by the 18th century and brought to North America in the 19th century by Italian immigrants. After the Second World War, breeding of United States and Japanese F1 hybrids increased yields, quality, growth speed, and regional adaptation, which produced the cultivars that have been the most popular since then: 'Premium Crop', 'Packman', and 'Marathon'.

Other cultivar groups of Brassica oleracea

Other cultivar groups of Brassica oleracea include cabbage (Capitata Group), cauliflower and Romanesco broccoli (Botrytis Group), kale (Acephala Group), collard (Viridis Group), kohlrabi (Gongylodes Group), Brussels sprouts (Gemmifera Group), and kai-lan (Alboglabra Group). As these groups are the same species, they readily hybridize: for example, broccolini or "Tenderstem broccoli" is a cross between broccoli and kai-lan. Broccoli cultivars form the genetic basis of the "tropical cauliflowers" commonly grown in South and Southeastern Asia, although they produce a more cauliflower-like head in warmer conditions.

Varieties
There are three commonly grown types of broccoli. The most familiar is Calabrese broccoli, often referred to simply as "broccoli", named after Calabria in Italy. It has large (10- to 20-cm) green heads and thick stalks. It is a cool-season annual crop. Sprouting broccoli (white or purple) has a larger number of heads with many thin stalks. Purple cauliflower or violet cauliflower is a type of broccoli grown in Europe and North America. It has a head shaped like cauliflower but consisting of many tiny flower buds. It sometimes, but not always, has a purple cast to the tips of the flower buds. Purple cauliflower may also be white, red, green, or other colors.

Other popular cultivars include Belstar, Blue Wind, Coronado Crown, Destiny, DiCicco, Green Goliath, Green Magic, Purple Sprouting, Romanesco, Sun King and Waltham 29.

Beneforté is a variety of broccoli containing 2–3 times more glucoraphanin and produced by crossing broccoli with a wild Brassica variety, Brassica oleracea var villosa.

Cultivation
The majority of broccoli cultivars are cool-weather crops that do poorly in hot summer weather. When the cluster of flowers, also referred to as a "head" of broccoli, appear in the center of the plant, the cluster is generally green. Broccoli should be harvested before the flowers on the head bloom bright yellow.

Production

In 2019, global production of broccoli (combined for production reports with cauliflowers) was 27 million tonnes, with China and India together accounting for 73% of the world total. Secondary producers, each having about one million tonnes or less annually, were the United States, Spain, and Mexico.

In the United States, broccoli is grown year-round in California – which produced 92% of the crop nationally – with 95% of the total crop produced for fresh sales in 2018.

Broccoli cannot be harvested using machines, meaning it must be hand-harvested.

Nutrition

A 100-gram reference serving of raw broccoli provides 34 calories and is a rich source (20% or higher of the Daily Value, DV) of vitamin C (107% DV) and vitamin K (97% DV) (table). Raw broccoli also contains moderate amounts (10–19% DV) of several B vitamins and the dietary mineral manganese, whereas other micronutrients are low in content (less than 10% DV). Raw broccoli is 89% water, 7% carbohydrates, 3% protein, and contains negligible fat (table).

Cooking
Boiling substantially reduces the levels of broccoli glucosinolates, while other cooking methods, such as steaming, microwaving, and stir-frying, have no significant effect on glucosinolate levels.

Taste
The perceived bitterness of cruciferous vegetables, such as broccoli, results from glucosinolates and their hydrolysis products, particularly isothiocyanates and other sulfur-containing compounds. Preliminary research indicates that genetic inheritance through the gene TAS2R38 may be responsible in part for bitter taste perception in broccoli.

Pests
Mostly introduced by accident to North America, Australia and New Zealand, "cabbage worms", the larvae of Pieris rapae, also known as the "small white" butterfly, are a common pest in broccoli.

Additional pests common to broccoli production include:
 Aphids
 Cabbage looper
 Cabbage webworm
 Cross-striped cabbageworm
 Diamondback moth
 Imported cabbageworm
 Cabbage maggot
 Harlequin cabbage bug

Gallery

See also

 Broccolini
 Epicuticular wax
 George H. W. Bush broccoli comments; the 41st U.S. president famously disliked the vegetable
 Microgreen

References

External links

 PROTAbase on Brassica oleracea (cauliflower and broccoli) (archived 10 February 2016)
 List of North American broccoli cultivars, USDA/ARS Vegetable Laboratory

Brassica
Crops originating from Europe
Edible plants
Food plant cultivars
Inflorescence vegetables
Italian words and phrases